Michael Herron (born 1986) is an Irish hurler who currently plays as a centre-back and vice-captain of the Antrim senior team.

A brother of Antrim hurlers Ciarán and Brendan, Herron made his first appearance for the team during the 2004 championship and has become a regular member of the starting fifteen since then.  During that time he won three Ulster winners' medals.

At club level Herron plays hurling and Gaelic football with Lámh Dhearg.

References

1986 births
Living people
Lámh Dhearg hurlers
Antrim inter-county hurlers
Ulster inter-provincial hurlers